Oliver Olsen (born 13 August 2000) is a Danish football player who plays as defender for FC Fredericia on loan from Danish Superliga club FC Midtjylland.

Club career

Esbjerg fB
In 2004, at the age of 4, Olsen started playing football with his friends at a local club called Starup IF. He did actually also go to both handball and swimming, besides also going to football. He later joined Esbjerg fB and in 2015, he signed his first contract with the club.

On 2 October 2017, Olsen sat on the bench for the first team of Esbjerg in a game against Vendsyssel FF in the Danish 1st Division.

FC Midtjylland
A half year before Olsens' contract with Esbjerg fB expired, on 1 February 2018, Esbjerg sold Olsen to FC Midtjylland where he began on their U-19 squad.

Olsen played the rest of the 2017/18 season with the U-19 squad. From the 2018/19 season, he was promoted to the first team squad. In November 2018, Olsen sat on the bench for the first team against his former club Esbjerg fB. One month later, on 16 December 2018, he made his professional debut for the club. Olsen started on the bench, but replaced Rilwan Hassan with one minute left of the game.

On 29 July 2021, Olsen was loaned out to Danish 1st Division club FC Fredericia for the 2021-22 season, to get some playing time.

References

External links
Oliver Olsen at FCM's website

2000 births
Living people
Danish men's footballers
Danish Superliga players
FC Midtjylland players
FC Fredericia players
Association football defenders
People from Ribe
Sportspeople from the Region of Southern Denmark